The Temporary Law of Deportation, also known as the Tehcir Law (from tehcir, an Ottoman Turkish word meaning "deportation" or "forced displacement" as defined by the Turkish Language Institute), or, officially by the Republic of Turkey, the "Sevk ve İskân Kanunu" (Relocation and Resettlement Law) was a law passed by the Ottoman Council of Ministers on May 27, of 1915 authorizing the deportation of the Ottoman Empire's Armenian population. The resettlement campaign resulted in the deaths of anywhere between 800,000 and over 1,500,000 civilians, in what is commonly referred to as the Armenian genocide. The bill was officially enacted on June 1, 1915, and expired on February 8, 1916.

Issues 

The Tehcir Law was part of the euphemistic  "special measures" against the Armenian population taken by the Ottoman Empire during World War I. This was coupled with a second set of orders given to the "Special Organization" for the systematic elimination of the evacuated population during the death marches, and the appropriation of their vacated properties.

The Ottoman archives document that the Armenian deportations started as early as March 2, 1915. After the expiration of the Tehcir Law, deportations and massacres continued. On September 13, 1915, the Ottoman parliament passed the "Temporary Law of Expropriation and Confiscation," stating that all property, including land, livestock, and homes belonging to Armenians, was to be confiscated by the Ottoman authorities.

Background 
Before the Ottoman parliament implemented the "Tehcir Law", there was a circular by Talaat Pasha. In the night of April 24, 1915, Talaat, who was the minister of interior at the time, ordered 250 Armenian intellectuals to be deported from Constantinople.

In May 1915, Mehmed Talaat Pasha requested that the Ottoman Cabinet and the then Grand Vizier Said Halim Pasha legalize a measure for relocation and settlement of the Armenians to other places. Talaat's words were "the Armenian riots and massacres, which had arisen in a number of places in the country are a threat to national security."

The nature of the law 
Tehcir Law was officially a "temporary" law that expired on February 8, 1916. It was a civil law, planned, implemented and enforced with an office (created by the law) to coordinate the activities under the name of "Migrant General Directorate" (Ottoman Turkish: Muhacirin Müdüriyet-i Umumîyesi). The civil law gave the military an enforcing power only if there were parties opposing the implementation. The rules and regulations of the law, as published in the Takvim-i Vekayi (Ottoman official newspaper), were public and they were shared with all the political parties.

Contents 
The Tehcir Law was allegedly about 
 the military measures against those opposing government orders, national defense, and the protection of peace and against those organizing armed attacks and resistance, and killing rebels during aggression and uprising in wartime, 
 the transfer and resettlement on a single basis or en masse, the people living in villages and towns who are found to be engaged in espionage or treason, 
 the temporary law's effect and expiration, and 
 the definition of the responsible parties (application).

One Ottoman Archival material, dated from July 12, 1915, suggests that massacres were part of those measures implemented against the Armenians. The Turkish Martial Court supports this by referring to documents that claim that the main reason for the evacuation was annihilation.

Although this law was directed against one particular ethnic group (the Armenians), the Assyrian population of the Ottoman Empire also fell victim as did some other Christians from the East.

In the text of the law, there is no explicit mention of the Armenian Question, and the text contains that: (1) the ill, (2) the blind, (3) Catholics, (4) Protestants, (5) the soldiers and their families, (6) the officers, (7) merchants, some workers and masters were not subject to evacuation. If conditions got worse, these groups are ordered to be settled in the city centers.

Capitulations of the Ottoman Empire granted missionaries a protectorate state (see:Protectorate of missions). There is a group of rules that grant rights to missionaries under the Ottoman Empire. Another decipher orders the Catholic Armenian missionaries not to leave the Ottoman Empire until the next order. This message was not respected in some centers, such as Maraş and Konya.

Fate of the subjects 
The law included a responsible party for the protection of properties the owners could/will return in a later term. Another law was passed to regulate the enforcement of this section On 10 June 1915. In this section, it was demanded that there would be three copies of this information; one kept in the regional churches, one in the regional administration, and one kept by the commission responsible for the execution of the law. The second and third parties of this law were held responsible for the protection of the properties until the immigrants' return.

While on the surface the law was allegedly temporary, the main reason of the law was to settle the Armenian question once for all, therefore permanently. Kamuran Gurun has released archival material from the minister of war that provides the aim of passing the law. In that letter Enver takes it as permanent and not temporary with the aim of fixing the Armenian problem once and for all.

While it is claimed that the debts of the evacuated population were to be completely canceled, and recurring tax debts (property tax) of the Armenians were to be postponed until their supposed return, the Armenian properties were seized by the government, sold or given to the Muslim residents or immigrants. A significant amount of money made from the sale of the seized properties was transferred and secured in Berlin.

Financial aspects 
A fund was initiated with the law. The control of the fund was assigned to director Şükrü Bey, a directorate under the immigrants general office (Immigrant and Tribe Settling). He was accused of complicity during the courts-martial in the destruction of the Armenian population. Also considered to maintain the link between the Ittihadists and the Special Organization. From the documents:

Also, the Ottoman government under the international agreements assigned within the capitulations, enabled fund transfers using the missionaries and consuls. Armenian immigrants from the United States sent funds, which were distributed to the Armenians under the knowledge of the government by these institutions. The American Near East Relief Committee, a relief organization for refugees in the Middle East, helped donate over $102 million to Armenians both during and after the war.

It has to be noted that the funds within the provinces aided the immigrants, whose money allocations were sent under provincial budgets depending on the condition of needs.

Those are contradicted by the Ottoman barring access to its own allies relief to the starving Armenian population.

Repeal of the law 
The law was repealed on February 21, 1916, with an order sent to all Ottoman provinces, while the destruction of the Armenian population continued. Claimed political detainees continued to be displaced to the Der Zor province. All the activities finalized on March 15, 1916.

References

Further reading
 
 

1915 in Armenia
1915 in the Ottoman Empire
1915 in law
Armenian genocide
Politics of the Ottoman Empire
Ottoman period in Armenia
World War I
Christianity in the Ottoman Empire